This is a complete list of Azerbaijani wrestlers.

A 
 Arif Abdullayev
 Namig Abdullayev
 Sona Ahmadli
 Emin Ahmadov
 Ashraf Aliyev 
 Hasan Aliyev 
 Azad Asgarov
 Toghrul Asgarov
 Emin Azizov

B 
 Patimat Bagomedova
 Rovshan Bayramov

C 
 Chamsulvara Chamsulvarayev

D 
 Islam Dugushiev

G 
 Khetag Gazyumov 
 Zafar Guliyev

H 
 Jabrayil Hasanov 
 Masoud Hashemzadeh 
 Zelimkhan Huseynov

I 
 Mogamed Ibragimov
 Aydin Ibrahimov 
 Ali Isayev 
 Khazar Isayev

M 
 Rashid Mammadbeyov 
 Farid Mansurov

P 
 Mehmet Akif Pirim

R 
 Vitaliy Rahimov 
 Yuliya Ratkevich

S 
 Namig Sevdimov 
 Sharif Sharifov 
 Mariya Stadnik

T 
 Saman Tahmasebi 
 Novruz Temrezov

See also
•
 List of Azerbaijani footballers

References

 
Wrestlers
Lists of Amateur wrestlers